Ropa is a river of mountainous southern Poland, a tributary of the Wisłoka.

Near the town of Łosie, Gorlice County, the Ropa was dammed in 1994 to create Lake Klimkowskie.  Downstream it flows through Biecz and joins the Wisłoka at Jasło.  During the 2010 Central European floods the Ropa flooded Jasło on June 5.

Its own tributaries include the Libuszanka and the Zdynia.

References 

Rivers of Poland
Rivers of Podkarpackie Voivodeship
Rivers of Lesser Poland Voivodeship